is a railway station in the city of  Shinshiro, Aichi Prefecture, Japan, operated by Central Japan Railway Company (JR Tōkai).

Lines
Nodajō Station is served by the Iida Line, and is located 17.9 kilometers from the starting point of the line at Toyohashi Station.

Station layout
The station has two opposed side platforms connected by a level crossing.The station building has automated ticket machines, TOICA automated turnstiles and is unattended.

Platforms

Adjacent stations

|-
!colspan=5|Central Japan Railway Company

Station history
Nodajō Station was established on January 1, 1918 as a station on the now-defunct . It was named after Noda Castle, the site of an important siege in 1573, during the Sengoku period. On August 1, 1943, the Toyokawa Railway were nationalized along with some other local lines to form the Japanese Government Railways (JGR) Iida Line.  Scheduled freight operations were discontinued in 1971. The station has been unattended since February 1984. Along with its division and privatization of JNR on April 1, 1987, the station came under the control and operation of the Central Japan Railway Company (JR Tōkai)

Surrounding area
 Yokohama Rubber Shinshiro plant
 Noda Castle ruins

See also
 List of Railway Stations in Japan

References

External links

Railway stations in Japan opened in 1918
Railway stations in Aichi Prefecture
Iida Line
Stations of Central Japan Railway Company
Shinshiro, Aichi